Fitz Eugene Dixon Jr. (August 14, 1923 – August 2, 2006) was an American educator, sportsman, and philanthropist.

Early life
He was the son of banker Fitz Eugene Dixon Sr. and Eleanor Widener (1891-1966), a member of the wealthy Widener family from Philadelphia, Pennsylvania. The Dixons built "Ronaele Manor" ("Eleanor" spelled backward), an Elizabethan mansion, in Elkins Park, Pennsylvania, where Fitz Jr. grew up.

Fitz Jr. graduated from Philadelphia's Episcopal Academy, then Harvard University, after which he returned to Episcopal to teach English, French, and Health; he also coached the school's squash, tennis, and 120-pound football teams and served as director of athletics and assistant to the headmaster.

Career
In 1971, on the death of his mother's childless surviving brother George Dunton Widener Jr., Fitz Jr. inherited his uncle's entire estate, including the  Erdenheim Farm in Whitemarsh Township, Pennsylvania, and took over the running of the Widener Foundation. The Widener fortune, amassed in the meat-packing and streetcar businesses, saw Fitz Eugene Dixon Jr. listed in Forbes Magazine's 400 Richest Americans in 1985, 1991, and 1995.

Dixon bred thoroughbred racehorses at Erdenheim Farm, and was a member and one-time Chairman of the Pennsylvania Horse Racing Commission. Dixon was also a patron of equestrian show jumping, having owned such horses as Jet Run and Rhum IV, who competed and medaled in domestic, Pan American, World Cup, and Olympic events.

Professional sports
Dixon became an owner of and investor in Philadelphia professional sports franchises, including the Eagles, the Phillies, the Flyers, and the Wings, but his most notable sports investment was the Philadelphia 76ers. He served as vice chairman for the Flyers when they won the Stanley Cup in 1974 and 1975. He purchased the Philadelphia 76ers from Irv Kosloff for $8 million on May 28, 1976, and a few months later brought Julius "Dr. J." Erving to the team for $6.6 million. In his brief stint as owner, the team made it to the NBA finals twice but never won a championship. He sold the team to Harold Katz in 1981.

Philanthropy
One of his best-known civic accomplishments was the 1976 purchase of the iconic Love sculpture that now stands at the head of John F. Kennedy Plaza in Center City Philadelphia. Dixon purchased the statue from the Robert Indiana studio after the artist had removed it from the city when it failed to come up with the $45,000 he had sought for its purchase. Dixon bought the sculpture for $35,000 and donated it to the city. The plaza has since come to be known popularly as LOVE Park.

He served on the boards of the Fairmount Park Commission, the Philadelphia Art Commission, and the Delaware River Port Authority, and was at times chairman of all three.

He also served on the boards of several universities, including as chairman at Widener University, Lafayette College, Philadelphia College of Art, and Temple University. The Dixon Halls, North and South, at Widener University were enabled by his gift to establish an alternative apartment living experience for upper-class students.  Temple University's Dixon Hall, built in 1983 on the university's Ambler campus, is named in his honor. Dixon Hall, a residence hall at Kutztown University of Pennsylvania, is also named after him. He was also selected in 1982 as the founding chairman of the board of governors of the State System of Higher Education, which was founded to bring together several former teachers' colleges and Indiana University of Pennsylvania. In 1993, the system's headquarters, the Dixon University Center, was named in his honor. The Dixon Trophy, awarded each season by the Pennsylvania State Athletic Conference to the league's most successful program, is also named for him.

Personal life
In 1952, he married Edith Bruen Robb, the daughter of David B. Robb. Together, they had two children.

Dixon died of melanoma on August 2, 2006, in Abington, Pennsylvania, near Philadelphia, where he was interred at Saint Thomas' Church Cemetery in Whitemarsh.

References

External links

Obituary at the Chestnut Hill Local
Obituary at 6abc.com
Obituary at Temple University
Obituary at the New York Times

1923 births
2006 deaths
Harvard University alumni
National Basketball Association executives
Philadelphia 76ers owners
National Hockey League executives
National Hockey League owners
Philadelphia Flyers executives
Philadelphia Flyers owners
People from Hancock County, Maine
Stanley Cup champions
Widener family
Members of the Philadelphia Club
People from Cheltenham, Pennsylvania
Deaths from cancer in Pennsylvania
Deaths from melanoma
Burials in Pennsylvania
People associated with the Philadelphia Museum of Art
Philadelphia Eagles owners